Rosshalde is a short novel by the German author Hermann Hesse.

Summary
Rosshalde deals with the failed marriage of the protagonist, painter Johann Veraguth and his wife Adele. The couple has two sons. The elder son moved away for college, and their younger son, Pierre, lives with them on their estate, Rosshalde. The couple, however, do not live together; Adele lives in the main house with Pierre, while Johann lives in a small house next to them. Pierre is the only thing which links Johann and Adele, and when he becomes very ill, the couple becomes somewhat closer.

Sources
 Hermann Hesse. Rosshalde. Bantam Books.

1914 German-language novels
Novels by Hermann Hesse
1914 German novels